Waterfront is a 1950 British black and white drama film directed by Michael Anderson and starring Robert Newton, Kathleen Harrison and Avis Scott. The screenplay concerns a sailor who abandons his family in the Liverpool slums. He returns years later causing family frictions. Adapted from the 1934 novel of the same title by Liverpool-born writer John Brophy, it was released in the United States as Waterfront Women.

Although often forgotten, it features a young (aged 25) Richard Burton in his third film appearance.

Plot
When ship's fireman Peter McCabe goes to sea in 1919, he leaves his long-suffering wife impoverished, with two young daughters and a son born soon after his departure. Despite his assurances to his elder daughter, Nora, he does not return or even send word. The family live in a Liverpool slum near the waterfront. Nora grows to hate her absent father.

Young George Alexander McCabe, named after the actor George Alexander, is bright and at 12 wins a scholarship. The mother, Nora and George go to the Empire Theatre to celebrate. Here George in his enthusiasm accidentally strikes a man on the back of the head whilst waving his lollipop. That man, Ben, is attracted to Nora. He gets off on the wrong foot when she learns that he is an engineer on a ship, but he overcomes her resistance and a romance develops. Ben intends to marry her after his next voyage, but a severe economic slump idles the docks, putting Ben out of work for two years. Ben suggests ending their engagement, fearing that he is a burden to her, but Nora will have none of that.

McCabe returns unexpectedly after 14 years. After his current ship, the SS Benediction, docks in Liverpool, he rejects a demotion over his troublemaking ways and quits. Nora is none too pleased at her father's shocking reappearance.

On his initial visit, he stays only briefly. After a dalliance with a blonde acquaintance, he learns of the existence of his son. He heads to the pub and drinks a lot of whisky. The second engineer of the Benediction appears and mocks McCabe. They brawl outside; he cuts the man's throat with a razor and is arrested. In a twist of fate, Ben comes on the scene and learns of the vacancy. He applies for the dead man's post straightaway and gets the job. The ship sails at midnight, so he can only send a note to Nora to tell her the news. When the police arrive to tell Mrs McCabe of her husband's arrest, Nora realises the coincidence with her father's own absences from home.

Instead of heading out to sea, the Benediction is diverted to Manchester for three days, giving Ben time to see Nora and insist they get married, which they do.

Mrs McCabe goes to the police station to see her husband, but he has been moved to Walton Jail. She visits him in his cell. When he asks, she confirms he has a son. George, waiting outside and wearing his school uniform, comes in and recites a Latin poem for his father.

Cast
 Robert Newton as Peter McCabe
 Kathleen Harrison as Mrs McCabe
 Avis Scott as Nora McCabe
 Susan Shaw as Connie McCabe
 Robin Netscher as George Alexander McCabe
 Richard Burton as Ben Satterthwaite
 Kenneth Griffith as Maurice Bruno
 Olive Sloane as Mrs Gibson
 James Hayter as Ship's captain
 Charles Victor as Bill, the tea and refreshments seller
 Michael Brennan as Engineer
 Allan Jeayes as Prison officer
 Hattie Jacques as Music hall singer

Critical reception
Writing in the Radio Times, David Parkinson noted a "sobering and little-seen portrait of Liverpool in the Depression...the film is undeniably melodramatic, but it has a surprisingly raw naturalism that suggests the influence of both Italian neorealism and the proud British documentary tradition. As the seaman whose drunken binges mean misery for his family and trouble for his shipmates, Robert Newton reins in his tendency for excess, and he receives solid support from the ever-dependable Kathleen Harrison and a young Richard Burton, in only his third feature."

References

External links

1950 films
1950 drama films
British black-and-white films
British drama films
1950s English-language films
Films based on British novels
Films directed by Michael Anderson
Films set in Liverpool
Films shot at Pinewood Studios
Films produced by Paul Soskin
Films with screenplays by Paul Soskin
1950s British films